
Gmina Haczów is a rural gmina (administrative district) in Brzozów County, Subcarpathian Voivodeship, in south-eastern Poland.

Administrative division
 Buków
 Haczów
 Jabłonica Polska
 Jasionów
 Malinówka
 Trześniów
 Wzdów

Villages
Gmina Haczów contains the villages and settlements of Buków, Haczów, Jabłonica Polska, Jasionów, Malinówka, Trześniów and Wzdów.

Neighbouring gminas
Gmina Haczów is bordered by the gminas of Besko, Brzozów, Jasienica Rosielna, Korczyna, Krościenko Wyżne, Miejsce Piastowe, Rymanów and Zarszyn.

References
 Polish official population figures 2006

Haczow
Brzozów County